Rosicrucianism is a spiritual and cultural movement that arose in Europe in the early 17th century after the publication of several texts announcing to the world a hitherto unknown esoteric order. Rosicrucianism is symbolized by the Rosy Cross or Rose Cross.   

Between 1610 and 1615, two anonymous manifestos appeared in Germany and soon after were published throughout Europe. The Fama Fraternitatis Rosae Crucis (The Fame of the Brotherhood of the Rosy Cross) was published at Cassel in 1614, though it had been circulated in manuscript among German occultists since about 1610. Johannes Valentinus Andreae has been considered the possible author of the work. A literal reading narrates the travels and education of "Father Brother C.R.C." and his founding of a secret brotherhood of similarly prepared men. Names, numbers, and other details have Cabalistic allusions in which the cognoscenti of that era were well versed. The Confessio Fraternitatis (The Confession of the Brotherhood of RC), published in Frankfurt in 1615, responded to confusions and criticisms and elaborated the matter further. 

Many were attracted to the promise of a "universal reformation of mankind" through a science "built on esoteric truths of the ancient past", which, "concealed from the average man, provide insight into nature, the physical universe, and the spiritual realm", which they say had been kept secret for decades until the intellectual climate might receive it. The manifestos elaborate these matters extensively but cryptically in terms of Qabalah, Hermeticism, alchemy, and Christian mysticism, subjects whose methods, symbolism, and allusions were ardently studied by many intellectuals of the period.

In 1617 a third anonymous volume was published, the Chymical Wedding of Christian Rosenkreutz. In his posthumously published autobiography, Johann Valentine Andreae acknowledged its origin in a romantic fantasy that he wrote before he was 16 years old (1602), among other likewise forgotten juvenilia, and which he elaborated in response to the Fame and Confession, and said of it that "the Chymical Wedding, with its fertile brood of monsters, a ludibrium which surprisingly some esteem and explicate with subtle investigations, is plainly futile and betrays the vanity of the curious" (Nuptiae Chymicae, cum monstrorum foecundo foetu, ludibriu, quod mireris a nonullis aestimatum et subtili indagine explicatum, plane futile et quod inanitatem curiosorum prodat). He also called Rosicrucianism a "ludibrium" (a lampoon or parody) during his lifetime, in writings advocating social and religious reform through a sectarian Christian organization of his design. Some scholars of esotericism suggest that Andreae said this to shield his clerical career from the wrath of the religious and political institutions of the day. "[I]t is clear from his "Turris Babel," "Mythologia Christiana," and other works, that he considered the Rosicrucian manifestoes a repreehensible hoax." This augmented controversies whether they were a hoax, whether the "Order of the Rosy Cross" existed as described in the manifestos, or whether the whole thing was a metaphor disguising a movement that really existed, but in a different form. 

The promise of a spiritual transformation at a time of great turmoil, the manifestos influenced many figures to seek esoteric knowledge. Seventeenth-century occult philosophers such as Michael Maier, Robert Fludd, and Thomas Vaughan interested themselves in the Rosicrucian worldview. In his work "Silentium Post Clamores" (1617), Meier described Rosicrucianism as having arisen from a "Primordial Tradition", saying "Our origins are Egyptian, Brahminic, derived from the mysteries of Eleusis and Samothrace, the Magi of Persia, the Pythagoreans, and the Arabs." 

In later centuries, many esoteric societies have claimed to derive from the original Rosicrucians. The most influential of these societies has been the Hermetic Order of the Golden Dawn, which derived from Societas Rosicruciana in Anglia and counted many prominent figures among its members. The largest is the Rosicrucian Order, AMORC, a multinational organization based in San Jose, California. Paul Foster Case, founder of the Builders of the Adytum as a successor to the Golden Dawn, published The true and invisible Rosicrucian Order, elaborating the Qabalistic basis and interpretation of the Fame and Confession.

Rosicrucian manifestos

Origins 

Between 1614 and 1617, three anonymous manifestos were published, first in Germany and soon after throughout Europe. The Fama Fraternitatis RC (The Fame of the Brotherhood of RC, 1614), the Confessio Fraternitatis (The Confession of the Brotherhood of RC, 1615), and the Chymical Wedding of Christian Rosicross anno 1459 (1617).

The Fama Fraternitatis presents the legend of a German doctor and mystic philosopher referred to as "Father Brother C.R.C." (later identified in a third manifesto as Christian Rosenkreuz, or "Rose-cross"). The year 1378 is presented as being the birth year of "our Christian Father", and it is stated that he lived 106 years. After studying in the Middle East under various masters, possibly adhering to Sufism, he was unable to spread the knowledge he had acquired to prominent European scientists and philosophers. Instead, he gathered a small circle of friends/disciples and founded the Rosicrucian Order (this can be deduced to have occurred around 1407).

During the lifetime of C.R.C., the order was said to comprise no more than eight members, each a doctor and "all bachelors of vowed virginity." Each member undertook an oath to heal the sick without accepting payment, to maintain a secret fellowship, and to find a replacement for himself before he died. Three such generations had supposedly passed between c. 1500 and c. 1600: a time when scientific, philosophical, and religious freedom had grown so that the public might benefit from the Rosicrucians' knowledge, so that they were now seeking good men.

Reception 
The manifestos were, and continue to be, not taken literally by many but rather regarded either as hoaxes or as allegorical statements. They state: "We speak unto you by parables, but would willingly bring you to the right, simple, easy, and ingenuous exposition, understanding, declaration, and knowledge of all secrets."

The first Rosicrucian manifesto was influenced by the work of the respected hermetic philosopher Heinrich Khunrath, of Hamburg, author of the Amphitheatrum Sapientiae Aeternae (1609), who was in turn influenced by John Dee, author of the Monas Hieroglyphica (1564). The invitation to the royal wedding in the Chymical Wedding of Christian Rosenkreutz opens with Dee's philosophical key, the Monas Hieroglyphica symbol. The writer also claimed the brotherhood possessed a book that resembled the works of Paracelsus. Adam Haslmayr a friend of Karl Widemann wrote him a letter about Rosicrucian people who revealed the Theophrastiam 24 December 1611.

In his autobiography, Johann Valentin Andreae (1586–1654) claimed that the anonymously published Chymical Wedding of Christian Rosenkreutz was one of his works, and he subsequently described it as a ludibrium. In his later works, he makes alchemy an object of ridicule and places it along with music, art, theater, and astrology in the category of less serious sciences. According to some sources, his role in the origin of the Rosicrucian legend is controversial. But according to others, it was generally accepted.

Rosicrucian Enlightenment 

In the early 17th century, the manifestos caused excitement throughout Europe by declaring the existence of a secret brotherhood of alchemists and sages who were preparing to transform the arts and sciences, and religious, political, and intellectual landscapes of Europe. Wars of politics and religion ravaged the continent. The works were re-issued several times, followed by numerous pamphlets, favorable or otherwise. Between 1614 and 1620, about 400 manuscripts and books were published which discussed the Rosicrucian documents.

The peak of the "Rosicrucianism furore" was reached when two mysterious posters appeared on the walls of Paris in 1622 within a few days of each other. The first said "We, the Deputies of the Higher College of the Rose-Croix, do make our stay, visibly and invisibly, in this city (...)", and the second ended with the words "The thoughts attached to the real desire of the seeker will lead us to him and him to us."

The legendary first manifesto, Fama Fraternitatis Rosae Crucis (1614), inspired the works of Michael Maier (1568–1622) of Germany; Robert Fludd (1574–1637) and Elias Ashmole (1617–1692) of England; Teophilus Schweighardt Constantiens, Gotthardus Arthusius, Julius Sperber, Henricus Madathanus, Gabriel Naudé, Thomas Vaughan and others. Rosicrucianism was associated with Protestantism (Lutheranism in particular).

In Elias Ashmole's Theatrum Chimicum britannicum (1650) he defends the Rosicrucians. Some later works impacting Rosicrucianism were the Opus magocabalisticum et theosophicum by George von Welling (1719)—of alchemical and paracelsian inspiration—and the Aureum Vellus oder Goldenes Vliess by Hermann Fictuld in 1749.

Michael Maier was appointed Pfalzgraf (Count Palatine) by Rudolf II, Holy Roman Emperor and King of Hungary and King of Bohemia. He also was one of the most prominent defenders of the Rosicrucians, clearly transmitting details about the "Brothers of the Rose Cross" in his writings. Maier made the firm statement that the Brothers of R.C. exist to advance inspired arts and sciences, including alchemy. Researchers of Maier's writings point out that he never claimed to have produced gold, nor did Heinrich Khunrath or any of the other "Rosicrucianists". Their writings point toward a symbolic and spiritual alchemy, rather than an operative one. In a combination of direct and veiled styles, these writings conveyed the nine stages of the involutive-evolutive transmutation of the threefold body of the human being, the threefold soul and the threefold spirit, among other esoteric knowledge related to the "Path of Initiation".

In his 1618 pamphlet, Pia et Utilissima Admonitio de Fratribus Rosae Crucis, Henrichus Neuhusius wrote that the Rosicrucians departed for the east due to European instability caused by the start of the Thirty Years' War. In 1710, Sigmund Richter, founder of the secret society of the Golden and Rosy Cross, also suggested the Rosicrucians had migrated eastward. In the first half of the 20th century, René Guénon, a researcher of the occult, presented this same idea in some of his works. An eminent author of the 19th century, Arthur Edward Waite, presented arguments contradicting this idea. It was in this fertile field of discourse that many Rosicrucian societies arose. They were based on the occult, inspired by the mystery of this "College of Invisibles".

Some modern scholars, for example Adam McLean and Giordano Berti, assume that among the first followers of the Rose Cross there was also the German theologian Daniel Cramer, who in 1617 published a bizarre treatise entitled "Societas Jesus et Rosae Crucis Vera" (The True Society of Jesus and the Rosy Cross), containing 40 emblematic figures accompanied by biblical quotations.

The literary works of the 16th and 17th centuries were full of enigmatic passages containing references to the Rose Cross, as in the following (somewhat modernized):

The idea of such an order, exemplified by the network of astronomers, professors, mathematicians, and natural philosophers in 16th-century Europe promoted by such men as Johannes Kepler, Georg Joachim Rheticus, John Dee and Tycho Brahe, gave rise to the Invisible College. This was the precursor to the Royal Society founded in 1660. It was constituted by a group of scientists who began to hold regular meetings to share and develop knowledge acquired by experimental investigation. Among these were Robert Boyle, who wrote: "the cornerstones of the Invisible (or as they term themselves the Philosophical) College, do now and then honour me with their company...";

John Wilkins and John Wallis, who described those meetings in the following terms: "About the year 1645, while I lived in London (at a time when, by our civil wars, academical studies were much interrupted in both our Universities), ... I had the opportunity of being acquainted with divers worthy persons, inquisitive natural philosophy, and other parts of human learning; and particularly of what hath been called the New Philosophy or Experimental Philosophy. We did by agreements, divers of us, meet weekly in London on a certain day and hour, under a certain penalty, and a weekly contribution for the charge of experiments, with certain rules agreed amongst us, to treat and discourse of such affairs..."

Legacy in esoteric orders

Rose-Cross Degrees in Freemasonry 

According to Jean Pierre Bayard, two Rosicrucian-inspired Masonic rites emerged toward the end of 18th century, the Rectified Scottish Rite, widespread in Central Europe where there was a strong presence of the "Golden and Rosy Cross", and the Ancient and Accepted Scottish Rite, first practiced in France, in which the 18th degree is called Knight of the Rose Croix.

The change from "operative" to "speculative" Masonry occurred between the end of the 16th and the beginning of the 18th century. Two of the earliest speculative Masons for whom a record of initiation exists were Sir Robert Moray and Elias Ashmole. Robert Vanloo states that earlier 17th century Rosicrucianism had a considerable influence on Anglo-Saxon Masonry. Hans Schick sees in the works of Comenius (1592–1670) the ideal of the newly born English Masonry before the foundation of the Grand Lodge in 1717. Comenius was in England during 1641.

The Gold und Rosenkreuzer (Golden and Rosy Cross) was founded by the alchemist Samuel Richter who in 1710 published Die warhhaffte und vollkommene Bereitung des Philosophischen Steins der Brüderschaft aus dem Orden des Gülden-und Rosen-Creutzes (The True and Complete Preparation of the Philosopher's Stone by the Brotherhood from the Order of the Golden and Rosy Cross) in Breslau under the pseudonym Sincerus Renatus in Prague in the early 18th century as a hierarchical secret society composed of internal circles, recognition signs and alchemy treatises. Under the leadership of Hermann Fictuld the group reformed itself extensively in 1767 and again in 1777 because of political pressure. Its members claimed that the leaders of the Rosicrucian Order had invented Freemasonry and only they knew the secret meaning of Masonic symbols. The Rosicrucian Order had been founded by Egyptian "Ormusse" or "Licht-Weise" who had emigrated to Scotland with the name "Builders from the East". In 1785 and 1788 the Golden and Rosy Cross group published the Geheime Figuren or "The Secret Symbols of the 16th and 17th century Rosicrucians".

Led by Johann Christoph von Wöllner and General Johann Rudolf von Bischoffwerder, the Masonic lodge (later: Grand Lodge) Zu den drei Weltkugeln (The Three Globes) was infiltrated and came under the influence of the Golden and Rosy Cross. Many Freemasons became Rosicrucianists and Rosicrucianism was established in many lodges. In 1782 at the Convent of Wilhelmsbad the Alte schottische Loge Friedrich zum goldenen Löwen (Old Scottish Lodge Friedrich at the Golden Lion) in Berlin strongly requested Ferdinand, Duke of Brunswick-Lüneburg and all other Freemasons to submit to the Golden and Rosy Cross, without success.

After 1782, this highly secretive society added Egyptian, Greek, and Druidic mysteries to its alchemy system. A comparative study of what is known about the Gold and Rosenkreuzer appears to reveal, on the one hand, that it has influenced the creation of some modern initiatory groups and, on the other hand, that the Nazis (see The Occult Roots of Nazism) may have been inspired by this German group.

According to the writings of the Masonic historian E.J. Marconis de Negre, who together with his father Gabriel M. Marconis is held to be the founder of the "Rite of Memphis-Misraim" of Freemasonry, based on earlier conjectures (1784) by a Rosicrucian scholar Baron de Westerode and also promulgated by the 18th century secret society called the "Golden and Rosy Cross", the Rosicrucian Order was created in the year 46 when an Alexandrian Gnostic sage named Ormus and his six followers were converted by one of Jesus' disciples, Mark. Their symbol was said to be a red cross surmounted by a rose, thus the designation of Rosy Cross. From this conversion, Rosicrucianism was supposedly born, by purifying Egyptian mysteries with the new higher teachings of early Christianity.

According to Maurice Magre (1877–1941) in his book Magicians, Seers, and Mystics, Rosenkreutz was the last descendant of the Germelshausen, a German family from the 13th century. Their castle stood in the Thuringian Forest on the border of Hesse, and they embraced Albigensian doctrines. The whole family was put to death by Landgrave Conrad of Thuringia, except for the youngest son, who was then five years old. He was carried away secretly by a monk, an Albigensian adept from Languedoc, and placed in a monastery under the influence of the Albigenses, where he was educated and met the four Brothers later to be associated with him in the founding of the Rosicrucian Brotherhood. Magre's account supposedly derives from oral tradition.

Around 1530, more than eighty years before the publication of the first manifesto, the association of cross and rose already existed in Portugal in the Convent of the Order of Christ, home of the Knights Templar, later renamed Order of Christ. Three bocetes were, and still are, on the abóboda (vault) of the initiation room. The rose can clearly be seen at the center of the cross. At the same time, a minor writing by Paracelsus called Prognosticatio Eximii Doctoris Paracelsi (1530), containing 32 prophecies with allegorical pictures surrounded by enigmatic texts, makes reference to an image of a double cross over an open rose; this is one of the examples used to prove the "Fraternity of the Rose Cross" existed far earlier than 1614.

Modern groups 

During the late 19th and early 20th centuries, various groups styled themselves Rosicrucian. The diverse groups who link themselves to a "Rosicrucian Tradition" can be divided into three categories: Esoteric Christian Rosicrucian groups, which profess Christ; Masonic Rosicrucian groups such as Societas Rosicruciana; and initiatory groups such as the Golden Dawn and the Ancient Mystical Order Rosae Crucis (AMORC).

Esoteric Christian Rosicrucian schools provide esoteric knowledge related to the inner teachings of Christianity.

The Rosicrucian Fellowship, 1909 at Mount Ecclesia (groundbreaking for first building: 1911). Teachings present the mysteries, in the form of esoteric knowledge, of which Christ spoke in Matthew 13:11 and Luke 8:10. The Fellowship seeks to prepare the individual through harmonious development of mind and heart in a spirit of unselfish service to mankind and an all-embracing altruism. According to it the Rosicrucian Order was founded in 1313 and is composed of twelve exalted Beings gathered around a thirteenth, Christian Rosenkreuz. These great adepts have already advanced far beyond the cycle of rebirth. Their mission is to prepare the whole wide world for a new phase in religion, which includes awareness of the inner worlds and the subtle bodies, and to provide safe guidance in the gradual awakening of man's latent spiritual faculties during the next six centuries toward the coming Age of Aquarius.

With the Edict of Toleration of Religion in 1905, several Russians of a mystical mind took advantage of it to form or resurrect what they considered the ancient forms of esoteric Orders. These were the new Rosicrucians. Their inspired mentors compiled volumes of mystic philosophy, and which they combined with their personal notions of what the ancient Orders were, and so formed groups. The 3 principal neo-Rosicrucian Orders of early Soviet Russia were Emesh Redivivus, the Orionist-Manicheans, and the Lux Astralis. Due to suppression by the Soviets they were eventually disbanded by 1933. 

According to Masonic writers, the Order of the Rose Cross is expounded in a major Christian literary work that molded the subsequent spiritual beliefs of western civilization: The Divine Comedy (ca. 1308–1321) by Dante Alighieri.

Other Christian-oriented Rosicrucian bodies include:

 Lectorium Rosicrucianum, 1924
 Archeosophical Society, 1968

Freemasonic Rosicrucian bodies providing preparation either through direct study and/or through the practice of a symbolic initiatory journey.
 Ancient and Accepted Scottish Rite, 1801
 Societas Rosicruciana in Anglia, 1866
Societas Rosicruciana in Canadiensis, 1876

Initiatory groups which follow a degree system of study and initiation include:
 The Ancient Mystical Order Rosae Crucis (AMORC), incorporated in the U.S. in 1915

Related groups 
Many of these groups generally speak of a linear descent from earlier branches of the ancient Rosicrucian Order in England, France, Egypt, or other countries. However, some groups speak of a spiritual affiliation with a true and invisible Rosicrucian Order. Note that there are other Rosicrucian groups not listed here. Some do not use the name "Rosicrucian" to name themselves. Some groups listed have been dissolved or are no longer operating.

 Order of the Golden and Rosy Cross, 1750s
 Ancient and Accepted Scottish Rite, 1776
 Fraternitas Rosae Crucis, 1861
 Societas Rosicruciana in Anglia (SRIA). ca. 1860–1865
 Societas Rosicruciana in America (SRIA), 1878
 Societas Rosicruciana in Civitatibus Foederatis (SRICF), 1879
 Cabalistic Order of the Rosicrucian (Kabbalistique de la Rose Croix), 1888
 Hermetic Order of the Golden Dawn, 1888
 Order of the Temple & the Graal and of the Catholic Order of the Rose-Croix (l'Ordre de la Rose Croix Catholique et Esthetique, du Temple et du Graal) (CRC) ('Catholic', as in 'Universal'), 1890
 Rosicrucian Fellowship (Association of Christian Mystics) 1909
 Anthroposophical Society, 1912
 Builders of the Adytum (BOTA), 1922
 Order of the Temple of the Rosy Cross, 1912
 Ancient Mystical Order Rosae Crucis (AMORC), 1915
 Fellowship of the Rosy Cross, 1915
 Corona Fellowship of Rosicrucians (CFR), c. 1918
 Rosicrucian Order Crotona Fellowship, 1924
 Lectorium Rosicrucianum, 1924
 Fraternitas Rosicruciana Antiqua (FRA), 1927
 The Saint Paul Rosicrucian Fellowship (Fraternidade Rosacruciana São Paulo), 1929
 Fraternitas Rosicruciana Antiqua, 1932
 Archeosophical Society, 1968
 Fraternity of the Hidden Light, 1982
 Confraternity Rosae + Crucis (CR+C), 1989
 Ancient Rosae Crucis (ARC), ?

See also

References

References 

Old editions
 Among the treasures of the Bibliotheca Philosophica Hermetica in Amsterdam are books on the Gnosis and the Corpus Hermeticum as published in Florence in 1471.
 The University of Wisconsin–Madison Digital Collections Center has a digital edition of the Geheime Figuren der Rosenkreuzer, aus dem 16ten und 17ten Jahrhundert (1785–1788).
Publications
 Bayard, Jean-Pierre (1986) Les Rose-Croix M. A. Éditions, Paris, in French
 Bayard, Jean-Pierre (1990) La Spiritualité de la Rose-Croix: Histoire, Tradition et Valeur Initiatique Dangles, Saint-Jean-de-Braye, France, in French
 Bernard, Christian (2001) Rosicrucian Order AMORC: Questions and Answers Grand Lodge of the English Language Jurisdiction, AMORC, San Jose, California, ; based upon the earlier versions by Harve Spencer Lewis 1929 and following, and Heindel, Max (1910) 'The Rosicrucian philosophy in questions and answers M.A. Donohue & Company, Chicago, 
 Clymer, R. Swinburne (1916) The Rose Cross order: a short sketch of the history of the Rose Cross order in America, together with a sketch of the life of Dr. P. B. Randolph, the founder of the order Philosophical Publishing Company, Allentown, Pennsylvania, 
 Churton, Tobias (2009) The Invisible History of the Rosicrucians: The World's Most Mysterious Secret Society Inner Traditions, Rochester, Vermont, 
 Dietzfelbinger, K. (2005) Rosicrucians through the ages (translation of Dietzfelbinger, K. (1998) Rozenkruisers toen en nu Rozekruis Pers, Haarlem, Netherlands) Rozekruis Pers, Haarlem, Netherlands, 
 Edighoffer, Roland (1982) Rose-Croix et Société Idéale selon Johann Valentin Andreae (volume 1) Arma Artis, Neuilly-sur-Seine, in French
 Edighoffer, Roland (1987) Rose-Croix et Société Idéale selon Johann Valentin Andreae (volume 2) Arma Artis, Neuilly-sur-Seine, in French
 Frietsch, Wolfram (1999) Die Geheimnisse der Rosenkreuzer Rowohlt, Reinbeck bei Hamburg, in German
 Gorceix, Bernard (1970) La Bible des Rose-Croix: traduction et commentaire des trois premiers écrits rosicruciens (1614–1615–1616) PUF, Paris, in French
 Hall, Manly Palmer (1929) "Chapter 19: Rosicrucian and Masonic Origins" Lectures on Ancient Philosophy: An Introduction to the Study and Application of Rational Procedure Hall Publishing Company, Los Angeles, ; full text from The Mystic Light Hall, Manly Palmer (1928) The Secret Teachings of All Ages: An Encyclopedic Outline of Masonic, Hermetic, Quabbalistic and Rosictucian Symbolical PhilosophyPhilosophical Research Society, Los Angeles, ; see full text from The Internet Sacred Text Archive Heindel, Max (1909) The Rosicrucian Cosmo-Conception or Christian Occult Science, An Elementary Treatise Upon Man's Past Evolution, Present Constitution and Future Development Independent Book Company, Chicago, ; [http://www.rosicrucian.com/rcc/rcceng00.htm full text of updated version entitled 'The Rosicrucian Cosmo-Conception or Mystic Christianity, An Elementary Treatise Upon Man's Past Evolution, Present Constitution and Future Development] from The Rosicrucian Fellowship
 Jennings, Hargrave (1870) The Rosicrucians: Their Rites and Mysteries John Camden Hotten, London, ; reprinted in 1976 by Arno Press, New York, 
 Lindgren, Carl Edwin as "Neophyte" (1996) Spiritual Alchemists: Rosicrucians, the Brotherhood of Light Ars Latomorum Publications, New Orleans, Louisiana, 
 Lindgren, Carl Edwin The Rose Cross Order: A Historical and Philosophical View full text from Professor Lindgren’s web site
 Macedo, António de (2000) Instruções Iniciáticas – Ensaios Espirituais (2nd edition) Hughin Editores, Lisbon; see partial view from Hughin Editores, in Portuguese
 Matthews, John (1999) The Rosicrucian Enlightenment Revisited Lindisfarne Books, Hudson, New York, 
 McIntosh, Christopher (1992) The Rose Cross and the Age of Reason: Eighteenth-century Rosicrucianism in Central Europe and its relationship to the Enlightenment, E.J. Brill, New York, 
 Palou, Jean (1964) La franc-Maçonnerie (The French Masons) Payot, Paris, in French
 Pincus-Witten, Robert (1976) Occult Symbolism in France: Joséphin Péladan and the Salons de la Rose-Croix Garland Publishing, New York, 
 Rebisse, Christian (2005) Rosicrucian History and Mysteries (translation of Rebisse, Christian (2003) Rose-croix histoire et mysteres) Supreme Grand Lodge of AMORC, San Jose, California, 
 Silberer, Herbert (1917) Problems of mysticism and its symbolism (translation of Silberer, Herbert (1914) Probleme der mystik und ihrer symbolik Heller, Vienna) Moffat, Yard and Company, New York, ; reprinted in 1970 by S. Weiser, New York, 
 Steiner, Rudolf (1984) Esoteric Christianity and the Mission of Christian Rosenkreutz: Thirteen lectures given in various European cities in the years 1911 and 1912 (a partial translation of Steiner, Rudolf (1962) Das esoterische Christentum und die geistige Führung der Menschheit: dreiundzwanzig Vorträge, gehalten in den Jahr. 1911 und 1912 in verschiedenen Städten Verlag der Rudolf Steiner-Nachlassverwaltung, Dornach, Switzerland) Rudolf Steiner Press, London, ; see  full text from the Rudolf Steiner Archive
 Steiner, Rudolf (1965) Rosicrucianism and Modern Initiation: Mystery Centres of the Middle Ages: Six lectures given in Dornach, 4–13 January 1924 (translation of Steiner, Rudolf (1950)  Mepterienstätte des Mittelalters: Rosenkreuzertum und Modernes Einweihungsprinzip, printed as volume two of The Mission of Christian Rozenkreuz) R. Steiner, London, ; see  full text from the Rudolf Steiner Archive
 Waite, Arthur Edward (1887) The Real History of the Rosicrucians G. Redway, London ; reprinted in 1960 by Society of Metaphysicians, Hastings, England, ; reprinted in 2000 by Garber Communications, Blauvelt, New York, ; see full text from The Internet Sacred Text Archive
 Waite, Arthur Edward (1916–1918) Complete Rosicrucian Initiations of the Fellowship of the Rosy Cross ; reprinted in 2005  and 2007  by Ishtar Publishing, Burnaby, British Columbia; renamed in 2008 Rosicrucian Rites and Ceremonies of the Fellowship of the Rosy Cross by Founder of the Holy Order of the Golden Dawn Arthur Edward Waite  book description from Ishtar Publishing
 Westcott, William Wynn (1885) Rosicrucian Thoughts on the Ever-Burning Lamps of the Ancients (pamphlet) G. Kenning, London; reprinted in 1979 by David Medina, London, ; see full text from The Alchemy Web Site
 Williamson, Benedict J. (editor) (2002) The Rosicrucian Manuscripts Invisible College Press, Arlington, Virginia, 
 Yates, Frances (1972) The Rosicrucian Enlightenment Routledge, London, ; reprinted in 2002 by Routledge, New York, 
Essays
 Alexandre David, Fama Fraternitatis – Introduction www
 Corinne Heline, The Seven Jewels and the Seven Stages of Initiation  www
 Prinke, Rafal T. Michael Sendivogius and Christian Rosenkreutz, The Unexpected Possibilities, The Hermetic Journal, 1990, 72-98 Rafal T. Prinke - Michael Sendivogius and Christian Rosenkreutz
Fictional literature
 St. Leon: A Tale of the Sixteenth Century by William Godwin, 1799
 St. Irvyne; or, The Rosicrucian by Percy Bysshe Shelley, 1811, London, John Joseph Stockdale
 Wolfstein; or, The Mysterious Bandit by Percy Bysshe Shelley, circa 1815, J. Bailey, London, a chapbook reduction of St. Irvyne
 Edward Bulwer-Lytton, Zanoni: A Rosicrucian Tale (1842), www
 Edward Bulwer-Lytton, Vril: The Power of the Coming Race (1870) www
 Franz Hartmann, With the Adepts: An Adventure Among the Rosicrucians (1910) www
 Hermann Hesse, Journey to the East (1932, also "Journey to the Land of the Morning/of the Tomorrow" (Die Morgenlandfahrt))
 Hermann Hesse, The Glass Bead Game (1943), also known as "Magister Ludi" (Master of the Game)
 Prentiss Tucker, In the Land of the Living Dead: an Occult Story (1929) www
 Antal Szerb, "The Pendragon Legend" (1934) (Translated by Len Rix).
Conspiracy literature
 Michael Baigent, Richard Leigh and Henry Lincoln, Holy Blood, Holy Grail (1982), advanced a pseudohistorical relation of Rosicrucianism with a secret society called Priory of Sion.
 Umberto Eco, Foucault's Pendulum (1988), Serendipities: Language and Lunacy (1998).
 Dan Brown, The Da Vinci Code (2003), follows the Holy Blood, Holy Grail'''s conspiracy theories line.
 Dan Brown, The Lost Symbol'' (2009)

External links 

 Alchemy Web Site (The): Rosicrucianism
 Catholic Encyclopedia: Rosicrucians
 Orthodox America: The Rosicrucians
 Reverse Spins: The Mysterious Rosicrucian...
 Straight Dope (The):  archived from the original What is Rosicrucianism all about?
 The Societas in Rosicruciana in Canada
 Rose Cross Order
 Rosicrucian Society 
 Aesthetic Rose+Croix Order of the Temple and the Grail
 Shubin, Daniel H. New Rosicrucians of early Soviet Russia   

 
Alchemical traditions
Esoteric Christianity
Esoteric schools of thought
Hermeticism
Secret societies